Solly Pernick (born 1897/1898) was an American stage technician. He won the Tony Award for Best Stage Technician in 1963, for his work on the original Broadway production of the musical Mr. President. He was the last person to win the award before it was retired.

Pernick served as business manager for 14 years and later as president of International Alliance of Theatrical Stage Employees Local One, a union for stagehands in New York City.

In addition to Mr. President, Pernick worked on shows including Uncle Tom's Cabin, Ain't Misbehavin', and the Ziegfeld Follies.

References

External links 

1890s births
Place of birth missing
American theatre people
Tony Award winners
Technicians
Year of death missing